DeKalb County is a county located in the northeastern part of the U.S. state of Alabama. As of the 2020 census, the population was 71,608. Its county seat is Fort Payne, and it is named after Major General Baron Johan DeKalb. DeKalb County is part of the Huntsville-Decatur-Albertville, AL Combined Statistical Area.

History
DeKalb County was created by the Alabama legislature on January 9, 1836, from land ceded under duress to the Federal government by the Cherokee Nation prior to their forced removal to Indian Territory west of the Mississippi River.

The county was named for Major General Baron Johann de Kalb, a hero of the American Revolution.

The city of Fort Payne, now the county seat, developed around a fort of the same name, built in the 1830s to intern Cherokee of the region prior to their removal. 

In the early 19th century, Sequoyah, the Cherokee man who independently created the Cherokee syllabary, a written system for his language, lived in this area. He had been born in a Cherokee town in Tennessee and migrated here in the early 1800s. His work enabled the Cherokee to publish the first Native American newspaper, The Phoenix, which they produced in Cherokee and English.

On the whole, DeKalb County is a dry county in terms of alcohol sales and consumption. In 2005, the city of Fort Payne passed a law to authorize the legal sale of alcohol. Collinsville and Henagar later also allowed alcohol sales.

21st-century natural events
The county's eastern edge, along the state line, was the epicenter of an earthquake on April 29, 2003, measuring 4.6 on the Richter scale. Power was knocked out in the area, mirrors and pictures thrown to the floor, foundations cracked, and one chimney fell to the ground.  The unusual earthquake for this region was felt over a significant portion of the southeastern states, including quite strongly in northeastern Alabama and neighboring northern Georgia, and nearby eastern Tennessee (especially near Chattanooga).  It was also felt slightly in western upstate South Carolina, far west-southwestern North Carolina, south and southeastern Kentucky, and east-northeastern Mississippi.

DeKalb County had one of the highest death tolls in Alabama during a massive tornadic system in April 2011, the 2011 Super Outbreak. A total of 31 deaths were reported in the county.

Geography

Adjacent counties
Jackson County - north
Dade County, Georgia - northeast (EST)
Walker County, Georgia - east (EST)
Chattooga County, Georgia - east (EST)
Cherokee County - southeast
Etowah County - south
Marshall County - west

National protected area
 Little River Canyon National Preserve (part)

Demographics

2020 census

As of the 2020 United States census, there were 71,608 people, 24,880 households, and 16,366 families residing in the county.

2010 census
As of the census of 2010, there were 71,109 people, 26,842 households, and 19,361 families living in the county.  The population density was 92 people per square mile (36/km2).  There were 31,109 housing units at an average density of 39.9 per square mile (15/km2).  The racial makeup of the county was 84.5% White (non-Hispanic), 1.5% Black or African American, 1.4% Native American, 0.3% Asian, 0.2% Pacific Islander, 9.9% from other races, and 2.2% from two or more races. 13.6% of the population were Hispanic or Latino of any race.

2000 census
As of the census of 2000, there were 64,452 people, 25,113 households, and 18,432 families living in the county.  The population density was 83 people per square mile (32/km2).  There were 28,051 housing units at an average density of 36 per square mile (14/km2).  The racial makeup of the county was 92.55% White (non-Hispanic), 1.68% Black or African American, 0.80% Native American, 0.19% Asian, 0.06% Pacific Islander, 3.10% from other races, and 1.62% from two or more races.  5.55% of the population were Hispanic or Latino of any race.

According to the census of 2000, the largest ancestry groups in DeKalb County were English 78.31%, Scotch-Irish 8.29%, Scottish 3.33%, Irish 3.31%, Welsh 1.22%, and African 1.68%.

Transportation

Major highways
 Interstate 59
 U.S. Route 11
 State Route 35
 State Route 40
 State Route 68
 State Route 75
 State Route 117
 State Route 176
 State Route 227

Rail
Norfolk Southern Railway

Government
DeKalb County is strongly Republican. Eighty-four percent of its voters supported Donald Trump in 2020, and no Democrat has carried it since Southerner Jimmy Carter did so in 1976. Populist appeal in the county during the period of "Redemption" meant that even during the "Solid South" era DeKalb County sometimes supported victorious Republican presidential candidates, as it did during the three Republican landslides of the 1920s.

Communities

Cities
Fort Payne (county seat)
Henagar
Rainsville

Towns

Collinsville (partly in Cherokee County)
Crossville
Fyffe
Geraldine
Hammondville
Ider
Lakeview
Mentone
Pine Ridge
Powell
Sand Rock (mostly in Cherokee County)
Shiloh
Sylvania
Valley Head

Unincorporated communities

Adamsburg
Alpine
Aroney
Beaty Crossroads
Cartersville
Chigger Hill
Dawson
Dog Town
Grove Oak
Guest
Hopewell
Lake Howard
Loveless
Sulphur Springs
Ten Broeck
Whiton

Ghost towns
Battelle
Bootsville
Rawlingsville

See also

National Register of Historic Places listings in DeKalb County, Alabama
Properties on the Alabama Register of Landmarks and Heritage in DeKalb County, Alabama

References

External links
Landmarks of DeKalb County 
DeKalb County History

 

 
1836 establishments in Alabama
Populated places established in 1836
Counties of Appalachia